Euralair was a charter airline based in France. Euralair was founded in 1964 as an air-taxi and executive charter company. In 1966 it became charter airline and operated its first charter flights in 1968 when it received the first Fokker F-27 (F-BRHL) on November 11, 1968, and the second (F-BRQL) on October 15, 1969; the last one sold to the Swiss company Belair (as HB-AAZ) in June 1973. In order to develop its charter activity, in November 1971 Euralair bought from Austrian Airline the first Sud Aviation Caravelle VIR (F-BSEL) and in 1973 the second (F-BTDL).

References

External links

Euralair History
Euralair Former Fleet Detail 
Euralair Boeing 737 in Mauritania

Defunct airlines of France
Airlines established in 1964
Airlines disestablished in 2003